Rondefontaine is a commune in the Doubs department in the Bourgogne-Franche-Comté region in eastern France.

Geography
It has views of the Remoray and Saint-Point lakes, the Jura mountains, and Switzerland.

Population

See also
 Communes of the Doubs department

References

External links

 Rondefontaine on the regional Web site 

Communes of Doubs